Pigna is the Italian word for pine cone and may refer to:

Places
 Australia
Pigna Barney River, a partly perennial river of the Manning River catchment, in the Upper Hunter district of New South Wales

France
Pigna, Haute-Corse, a commune in the Département of Haut-Corse, Corsica

Italy
Pigna, Lazio, a rione in the City of Rome
Pigna, Liguria, a comune in the Province of Imperia

People

Felipe Pigna, an Argentinian historian
Giovan Battista Pigna, an Italian humanist and poet

See also
 Fontana della Pigna